Feistel is a German surname. Notable people with the surname include:

Horst Feistel (1915–1990), German American cryptographer
Feistel cipher, a construction for designing modern ciphers
Magdalena Feistel (born 1970), Polish tennis player

German-language surnames